KDUP (88.1 FM) is a radio station licensed to Cedarville, California, United States. The station is owned by Openskyradio Corp.

See also
List of community radio stations in the United States

References

External links

DUP
Community radio stations in the United States